Ayit Aviation and Tourism is an Israeli domestic airline established in 2008.

History
Ayit flew between Sde Dov Airport, near Tel Aviv, and  Ben Ya'akov Airport near Rosh Pinna. As part of its agreement to operate the route, the airline agreed that IDF personnel would be allowed to fly from Tel Aviv to Rosh Pinna for free. 12,000 tickets were given to the Defense Ministry as a result.

A new route from the Rosh Pina Airport to Eilat Airport was announced in 2016. Due to the closure of Sde Dov Airport in 2019 the company no longer maintains flight routes to and from the airport.

Fleet
The Ayit fleet consists of the following aircraft:

See also
Aviation in Israel

References

External links

Ayit Aviation (hebrew)

Airlines of Israel
Airlines established in 1985
Companies based in Beersheba
1985 establishments in Israel
Transport in Beersheba